Norbert Krakowiak (born 28 July 1999) is a Polish motorcycle speedway rider.

Speedway career 
Krakowiak came to prominence as part of the Poland national under-21 speedway team that won the 2020 World team junior championship. and the 2020 Team Speedway Junior European Championship.

During 2022, he rode for Grudziądz in the Ekstraliga and Indianerna in the Elitserien. He also won a bronze medal at the 2022 European Pairs Speedway Championship.

References 

Living people
1999 births
Polish speedway riders